Nicole Ruth Cooley is an American poet. She has authored six collections of poems, including Resurrection, Breach, Milk Dress, and Of Marriage. Her work has appeared in Poetry, Field, Ploughshares, Poetry Northwest, The Paris Review, PEN America, The Missouri Review, and The Nation. She co-edited, with Pamela Stone, the "Mother" issue of Women's Studies Quarterly.

She grew up in New Orleans, Louisiana. She graduated from Brown University and The Iowa Writers' Workshop, and got her Ph.D. from Emory University.  Nicole Cooley has taught at Bucknell University. She is currently a professor at Queens College, City University of New York, where she directs the M.F.A. program in Creative Writing and Literary Translation.

Awards
 1994 "Discovery"/The Nation Award for poetry
 1995 Walt Whitman Award, chosen by Cynthia Macdonald
 1996 National Endowment for the Arts literature fellowship (fiction)
 2006 Writer Magazine/Emily Dickinson Award

Published works

Poetry
 
 
 
 Breach, Louisiana State University Press, 2009

Novel

Non-fiction

References

External links
 
 
 

Year of birth missing (living people)
Living people
Writers from New Orleans
Brown University alumni
Iowa Writers' Workshop alumni
Emory University alumni
Bucknell University faculty
Queens College, City University of New York faculty
American women poets
American women academics
Writers from New York City
21st-century American women